Berjeau is a French surname. Notable people with the surname include:

Jean-Paul Berjeau (born 1953), French swimmer 
Philibert Charles Berjeau (1845–1927), scientific illustrator and lithographer

French-language surnames